Hamilton South may refer to:
In Australia
Hamilton South, New South Wales
In Ontario, Canada:
Hamilton South (electoral district), 1953 to 1965
In Scotland, UK:
Hamilton South (UK Parliament constituency), 1997 to 2005
Hamilton South (Scottish Parliament constituency), 1999 to present
Hamilton South (ward), electoral ward